Phillip William Read,  (1 January 1939 – 6 October 2022) was an English professional motorcycle racer.  He competed in Grand Prix motorcycle racing from 1961 to 1976. Read is notable for being the first competitor to win world championships in the 125 cc, 250 cc and 500 cc classes. Although he was often overshadowed by his contemporary, Mike Hailwood, he won seven FIM Grand Prix road racing world championships. 

In the 1979 Birthday Honours, Read was appointed Member of the Order of the British Empire (MBE) "for services to motor cycle racing". He was named an FIM Legend in 2013 for his motorcycling achievements.

Early years

Born in the large Bedfordshire town of Luton on 1 January 1939, Read was a keen road-rider and worked as an apprentice fitter at Brown and Green, a Luton manufacturer of industrial machinery. His first road machine was a Velocette KSS which he started on at the UK legal-minimum riding age of sixteen in 1955, followed by a BSA Gold Star DBD32. He started amateur short-circuit racing in 1958 on a Duke BSA Gold Star. In 1960 he won the Junior Manx Grand Prix on a Manx Norton at record speed followed by the Junior (350cc) TT race in 1961. He placed second in the 350cc and 500cc races at the 1961 North West 200 in Northern Ireland on Manx Nortons.

He was a two-time winner of the Thruxton 500 endurance race in 1962 and 1963 riding Syd Lawton's Norton Dominator 650SS machines.

In 1963, the up and coming Read was temporarily drafted-in to fill Derek Minter's absence in the Scuderia Duke Gilera Grand Prix team, as Minter had been seriously injured in May at Brands Hatch after a last-lap accident when dicing for the lead with Dunstall rider Dave Downer, after which Downer died.

The 1963 Isle of Man Senior TT was won by Mike Hailwood on an MV, while the Duke team came 2nd (John Hartle) and 3rd (Read). In the following Dutch TT at Assen, the finishing order was: 1st (Hartle), 2nd (Read), with Mike Hailwood's MV retiring in the 500cc class. Read came second to Hailwood in the Belgium GP 500cc race. Minter recovered and returned in time to reclaim his team place for the next event, the Ulster GP at Dundrod in August. The Scuderia Duke Gilera Grand Prix team disbanded at the end of 1963.

Two stroke years
During the mid-1960s Yamaha had prolific riders in Read, Canadian Mike Duff and later Bill Ivy. In 1964, Read gave Yamaha their first world title when he won the 250cc class. He would repeat as champion the following year. For 1966, Yamaha would introduce a new, four cylinder 250cc bike. Teething problems with the new engine meant he would lose the crown to Hailwood. In 1967 he would battle Hailwood on his six-cylinder Honda all the way to the final round. They would end up tied but, Hailwood took the crown due to having five wins to Read's four. Read took over from Frank Perris in 1967 as representative for the Grand Prix Riders' Association.<ref name ="MC">Motor Cycle, 16 February 1967, p. 209 Racing Line by David Dixon. Read takes over from Perris. "Speaking from his Guernsey home, where he has a boat retailing business, Phil is just as anxious as Frank to keep the association going. Copies of the constitution are available from Phil Read, Hakone, Pleinmont Road, Tortegal, Guernsey, Channel Islands". Accessed and added 1 November 2014</ref>

The 1968 season proved to be controversial for Read. The Yamaha factory had wanted Read to concentrate on winning the 125cc title and teammate Bill Ivy to take the 250cc crown. After winning the 125cc championship, Read decided to disobey team orders and fight Ivy for the 250cc title. They finished the season tied in the points and Read was awarded the championship based on elapsed times. It proved a costly decision for Read, as Yamaha would never offer him another ride.

In January 1969, Read lent his support to a project intended to provide racing engines to the general public – dubbed Read Weslake, it was a prototype Weslake four-stroke 500cc vertical twin, with four valves per cylinder and gear-driven camshafts. Initially the engine was installed into standard Rickman Street Metisse frame intended for a Triumph Bonneville engine.

Read was to be rider and development consultant. He decided that the Metisse frame was too heavy, and despite intentions to manufacture a lighter race frame, he decided to abandon the Rickman frame in favour of a Reynolds frame built by Ken Sprayson for Tom Arter and his rider Peter Williams who had a project to replace their ageing Matchless G50.

Read was to be based at Weslake in Rye, England to develop the project further, releasing Peter Williams for his Norton work, but Read pulled out in November. The engine project continued, enlarging the capacity to 700cc in 1970 with some race entries sponsored by Geoff Monty before finally folding.

After sitting out most of the 1969 and 1970 grand prix seasons when the major Japanese factories all withdrew from Grands Prix racing, he concentrated on the major British and European international meetings.

Read returned full-time to the Grands Prix circuit in 1971 on a very special privateer production Yamaha developed under the direction of the Dutchman, Ferry Brouwer with twin disc brakes, improved horsepower and aerodynamics together with help from Eric Cheney (frame), Helmut Fath (dry clutch) and Rod Quaife (six speed transmission) but no factory support. On this bike he was able win the first three Grands Prix of the season and go on to claim his fifth world championship.

Four stroke years

In 1972 Read accepted an offer to ride for the MV Agusta factory racing team in the 350 World Championship. In 1973, riding in both the 350 and 500 classes, he took the 500cc title, the first World Championship won using Lockheed disc brakes. Also in 1973, he won the prestigious Mallory Park Race of the Year. He successfully defended his 500cc crown in 1974 in what would be the last world championship for the legendary Italian marque. It would also be the last time a four-stroke machine would win a title until the advent of the MotoGP class in 2002.

Read also had 'guest' rides as part of the JPS team Norton for 1972, finishing fourth in the Daytona 200-mile race. Other riders were Norton factory employee Peter Williams and Tony Rutter as third rider. Rutter was soon replaced by John Cooper

On the MV he gave Agostini's Yamaha a strong fight for the 1975 500cc championship but finished in second place. Realizing the writing was on the wall for four-stroke machinery, he left the Italian company to campaign a privateer Suzuki in the 1976 season after which he retired from Grand Prix racing.

Read entered TT events from 1977, winning the F1 (Formula 1) race on the works Honda CB750 SOHC and Senior race on a Suzuki. Again on the Honda for 1978 F1, he recorded a DNF but was placed 4th in the Classic. These races led to Honda producing a limited-production of 150 'Phil Read Replica' Formula 1 race-styled roadsters based on the CB750F2 with styling accessories by Seeley in Honda Britain colours of blue and red.

He competed in the 1978 TT against Mike Hailwood, who made a famous comeback riding a Ducati 900SS provided by Manchester dealer Sports Motorcycles. After another four year hiatus, Read's last race was at the Isle of Man TT in 1982 at the age of 43. The FIM named him a Grand Prix "Legend" in 2002.

A lesser-known aspect of Read's career was his involvement in endurance racing. He rode a Honda in the 24-hour Bol d'Or endurance race at Le Mans; and he won the Thruxton 500 endurance race in 1962 and 1963.

Controversy
Read was well-known within the racing paddock for his forthright and sometimes outspoken views, not least when it came to the dangers of the Snaefell Mountain Course. 

In particular this reflected Read's decision following the death of Gilberto Parlotti at the 1972 Isle of Man TT. The death of Parlotti prompted Parlotti's close friend, and Read's MV Augusta team mate, Giacomo Agostini, to publically state that he would never again compete at the TT. This decision had far reaching consequences for the TT and would lead to a walk-out of the top Grand Prix stars many of whom resorted to severe criticism of the organisation and safety at the event, with Read in the vanguard of the critics. 

In certain aspects the comments were justified and resulted in the Fédération Internationale de Motocyclisme taking the decision that the Isle of Man TT would be withdrawn from the World Championship calendar after the 1976 races. However the decision did cause a high degree of dissatisfaction with many pure road racing fans and resulted in some, not least those on the Isle of Man, forming a dislike of Read.

As a consequence of the withdrawal of the Isle of Man from the World Grand Prix Championship, a significant increase in prize money was pumped into the 1977 Isle of Man TT in addition to the creation of the TT Formula 1 World Championship. This in turn resulted in some candid cavilling concerning Read's decision to return to the TT, with him being subjected to numerous jeers. This continued into the 1978 TT, with Read cast very much in the role of a Pantomime Villain against the celebrated return of Mike Hailwood.

However in his defence Read always maintained that his sentiment reflected riders being contractually required to race at the Isle of Man as part of a World Championship campaign, as opposed to having the freedom of conscience governing their decision.

In time fans came to accept the conclusions taken in 1972 and for many years both Read and Agostini, along with many other former competitors, were frequent guests at the TT Races where they would ride on exhibition and parade laps.

Business interests
In 1967, Read was domiciled in the tax haven of Guernsey, where he had a business selling boats.

During the 1970s period, Read started to distribute Premier helmets and gave his name to a range of motorcycle clothing, including marketing a 'Phil Read Replica' full-face helmet with the familiar design and colour scheme of black with three white flashes and chequer strip.

Read also opened a Honda dealership at Hersham, Surrey in 1979.

Read lived in Canterbury Kent, spending the summers visiting race tracks around Europe and demonstrating some of the motorcycles from his racing career.

 Grand Prix motorcycle racing results 
Points system from 1950 to 1968:

Points system from 1969 onwards:

(key) (Races in bold indicate pole position; races in italics'' indicate fastest lap)

References

External Links 

 Phil Read official web site
 MotoGP Legends at MotoGP.com
 Phil Read career statistics at MotoGP.com
 Phil Read at iomtt.com

1939 births
2022 deaths
British motorcycle racers
English motorcycle racers
500cc World Championship riders
350cc World Championship riders
250cc World Championship riders
125cc World Championship riders
Isle of Man TT riders
Sportspeople from Luton
Members of the Order of the British Empire
500cc World Riders' Champions
250cc World Riders' Champions
125cc World Riders' Champions